Springs Junction is a significant road junction in New Zealand that connects two major highways, 
and State Highway 65 (the Shenandoah Highway).

State Highway 7 runs between Canterbury and the West Coast of New Zealand's South Island.

State Highway 65 heads north from the junction along the Maruia River and forms part of the main route between Christchurch and Nelson.

Springs Junction is also the name of the small settlement close to the junction. It includes a petrol station, a café and some houses.

Geography
Springs Junction lies on the Alpine Fault.

16 km to the east is the thermal resort of Maruia Springs. 6.5 km to the east is the DOC Marble Hill campsite

The closest main town is Reefton 45 km to the west.

At Springs Junction is a site where geologists have dug trenches to study past earthquakes along the Alpine Fault. Springs Junction has seen a major increase in traffic flows
 since the 2016 Kaikoura earthquake. This earthquake closed the main State Highway 1 route and Springs Junction is on the alternative route from Picton to Christchurch.
The New Zealand Transport Agency expects the volume of traffic to quadruple while the State Highway 1 route undergoes months of repairs.

Notable people 
Daniel White (born 1992), author of Halfstone: A Tale of the Narathlands

References 

Road junctions in New Zealand
Buller District
Populated places in the West Coast, New Zealand